Pseudahrensia aquimaris is a Gram-negative and non-motile bacterium from the genus of Pseudahrensia which has been isolated from seawater from the Yellow Sea on Korea.

References

External links
Type strain of Pseudahrensia aquimaris at BacDive -  the Bacterial Diversity Metadatabase

Hyphomicrobiales
Bacteria described in 2012